The term  gestes esthétiques ("epic aesthetics") refers to a quasi-mystical synthesis of the visual arts, literature and music.  The term has its origins in the Rosicrucian salons of Paris in the late 19th century.  Sonneries de la Rose+Croix is a product of this artistic environment.

References
Almanach de Gotha; Pincu-Witten, Robert, Occult Symbolism in France: Joséphin Péladan and the Salons de la Rose-croix, New York, 1976.
Volta, Ornella, Give a dog a bone: Some investigations into Erik Satie , English translation by Todd Niquette of Le rideau se leve sur un os, Revue International de la Musique Française, Vol. 8, No. 23, 1987.

French art movements